Beardy Waters, a watercourse and part of the Macintyre catchment within the Murray–Darling basin, is located in the Northern Tablelands region of New South Wales, Australia.

Etymology
The name of the river derives from two bearded stockmen, William Chandler and John Duval, who were among the first European settlers of the district through which the river flows. The river was previously known as Maybole Creek, The Beardy Water, Beardy River and The Beardy Waters.

Course
Beardy Waters rises below the Waterloo Range and Great Dividing Range, and flows generally north-east then north, before reaching its confluence with the Severn River, north of Glen Innes; descending  over its  course.

A weir construction across the Beardy Waters was commenced in October 1930 after a grant of 5,500 was made available for the work. This money was granted to pay men working on unemployment relief.

See also

 Rivers of New South Wales
 List of rivers of Australia

References

External links
 
 Beardies History House – website

Rivers of New South Wales
Murray-Darling basin
New England (New South Wales)